See also John Marten (academic) (died 1473), Master of University College, Oxford, England.

John Thomas Marten (born 1951) is a senior United States district judge of the United States District Court for the District of Kansas.

Education and career

Born in Topeka, Kansas, Marten received a Bachelor of Arts degree from Washburn University in 1973 and a Juris Doctor from Washburn University School of Law in 1976. He was a law clerk to former Associate Justice Tom C. Clark of the Supreme Court of the United States while Clark had senior status and was a visiting judge on several United States Courts of Appeals from 1976 to 1977. He was in private practice in Omaha, Nebraska from 1977 to 1980, then in Minneapolis, Minnesota until 1981, and then in McPherson, Kansas until 1996.

Federal judicial service

On October 18, 1995, Marten was nominated by President Bill Clinton to a seat on the United States District Court for the District of Kansas vacated by Patrick F. Kelly. Marten was confirmed by the United States Senate on January 2, 1996, and received his commission on January 4, 1996. He served as Chief Judge from April 22, 2014 to May 1, 2017. He assumed senior status on May 1, 2017.

Notable case

On August 15, 2013, Judge Marten held that an abortion opponent's letter to a Wichita doctor stating that someone might place an explosive under her car, absent sufficient contextual evidence indicating an imminent threat, is constitutionally protected speech and not a "true threat" under existing law. Judge Marten noted that the government supplied no evidence that actual violence against Dr. Mila Means was likely or imminent, especially since after receiving the letter the doctor changed plans to provide abortion services in Kansas.

See also 
 List of law clerks of the Supreme Court of the United States (Seat 10)

References

Sources

1951 births
Living people
Judges of the United States District Court for the District of Kansas
Law clerks of the Supreme Court of the United States
People from Topeka, Kansas
United States district court judges appointed by Bill Clinton
Washburn University alumni
People from McPherson, Kansas
20th-century American judges
21st-century American judges